Armavia was an airline that existed between 1996 and 2013. It was Armenia's flag carrier, with its head office on the grounds of Zvartnots International Airport in Zvartnots, Armenia, near Yerevan. It operated international passenger services from Yerevan to destinations in Europe and Asia. Its main base was Zvartnots International Airport.

On March 29, 2013, Armavia announced the decision to begin filing bankruptcy proceedings and suspend operations on 1 April 2013. All flights had been cancelled as of the evening of 29 March 2013.

History

The Armavia company was established in 1996, but commercial flights to Russia and Turkey only started in 2001. In 2002, a strategic alliance was set up with the Russian airline S7 Airlines which purchased 50% of Armavia's shares from the "Chernomoravia" company under the name of the "Aviafin" company registered in Armenia but which belongs to the leadership of S7 Airlines as natural persons. Later, it bought an additional 18% of shares from Mika Armenia Trading company owned by prominent Armenian businessman Mikhail Baghdasarov. An investment contract between S7 Airlines and Armavia was signed on 14 March 2003, at which point 68% of Armavia's shares were owned by S7 Airlines, and the remaining 32% by Mika Armenia Trading.

In 2003, Armavia took over a part of the bankrupt Armenian Airlines' flights. In 2005, Mikhail Baghdasarov's Mika Armenia Trading bought S7's 68% of shares and became Armavia's principal shareholder with a 100% stake in the company. In 2005, the airline transported 513,800 passengers with over 550 people in its personnel. The turnover for 2005 amounted to roughly $90 million. In 2007, the airline transported 572,300 passengers by regular and charter flights, a 21% increase compared to 2006.

The airline was owned by MIKA Armenia Trading (100%).

In 2010, the airline transported over 800,000 passengers.

On 21 April 2011, Armavia became the first airline to fly Sukhoi Superjet 100 from Yerevan to Moscow.

On 29 March 2013, Armavia ceased flying and filed for bankruptcy after two years of financial depression. The airline left many passengers stranded in the airports. Passengers would receive refunds after ceasing operations.

Destinations 

Armavia had always shown interest in serving Los Angeles (California) with non-stop flights from Yerevan, but had not revealed further details on the matter. They also lacked the proper aircraft to operate the flight. They also had non-stop flights to Amsterdam and Berlin.

Codeshare agreements
Armavia had codeshare agreements with the following airlines:

 Aerosvit
 airBaltic
 Air France (SkyTeam)
 El Al
 Rossiya Airlines
 Kuban Airlines
 LOT Polish Airlines (Star Alliance)
 Transaero
 Ural Airlines
 UTair
 VIM Airlines

Fleet 

In November 2012, the Armavia fleet consisted of the following aircraft:

Fleet developments
On 1 September 2007, Armavia signed a multimillion-dollar agreement with Russia's Sukhoi Civil Aircraft for two Sukhoi Superjet 100-95LR aircraft by the end of 2009. Under the agreement, Armavia had an option to acquire another two SuperJet 100-95LRs in the future. On 19 April 2011, Armavia took delivery of the first Sukhoi Superjet 100. In doing so, Armavia became the first company to put the aircraft in commercial revenue service. On 9 July 2012, it cancelled its order for a second Sukhoi Superjet 100.

On 7 August 2012, it was reported that Armavia had decided to return its remaining Sukhoi Superjet 100 to the manufacturer, citing reliability concerns. On 2 October 2012, the airline agreed to take back the first SSJ.

Incidents and accidents 
On 3 May 2006, an Armavia Airbus A320 (registration: EK-32009) operating as Armavia Flight 967 crashed into the Black Sea en route from Yerevan to Sochi, a seaside resort town in Russia. The fatal crash was a controlled flight into terrain accident, killing all 105 passengers and 8 crew on board. The aircraft was completely destroyed by impact with the water. The crash was caused by inadequate control inputs of the captain following a go-around after the first attempted approach. Contributing factors to the accident were the lack of necessary monitoring of the aircraft descent parameters by the first officer, and the improper reaction of the crew to the subsequent ground proximity warning system warning. Poor visibility and weather contributed to the crash as well.

References

External links

 

Defunct airlines of Armenia
Airlines established in 1996
Airlines disestablished in 2013
2013 disestablishments in Armenia
Armenian companies established in 1996